The Alaska State Medical Board is the medical governing board in the U.S. state of Alaska. It is staffed by the Division of Occupational Licensing.

ASMB is a member of the Federation of State Medical Boards.

History

COVID-19 
In December 2021, the Board received complaints from multiple doctors after receiving unsolicited gift bags from members of the Alaska Covid Alliance. The bags contained chocolates, a signed letter to the Board advocating for early treatment of COVID-19, and pamphlets advocating for off-label use of ivermectin.

References 

Healthcare in Alaska
Alaska